Sanchakou is a town on the Chinese-Russian border in Dongning, Heilongjiang province, China. , it had 13 villages under its administration. It was formerly known as Sanchakou Korean Ethnic Town.

See also 
 List of township-level divisions of Heilongjiang

References 

Township-level divisions of Heilongjiang
Dongning, Heilongjiang
Korean diaspora in China